Radovan Fořt (born 14 February 1965) is a Czech cyclist. He competed in the men's cross-country mountain biking event at the 1996 Summer Olympics.

References

External links
 

1965 births
Living people
Czech male cyclists
Olympic cyclists of the Czech Republic
Cyclists at the 1996 Summer Olympics
Sportspeople from Ústí nad Labem
20th-century Czech people
21st-century Czech people